Dowspuda (/) is a village in the administrative district of Gmina Raczki, within Suwałki County, Podlaskie Voivodeship, in north-eastern Poland.

Scottish settlers 
Around 1815–1821, Ludwik Michał Pac invited about 500 people from Scotland to the village, who were to teach the locals modern agriculture and various other crafts. The Scots founded a settlement called Szkocja and separate folwarks: Covenlock, New York (today Pruska Wielka), Longwood (Ludwinowo), Linton, Berwick (Korytki) and Bromfield (Józefowo). The Scots taught the local population how to switch from three-field system to crop rotation, encouraged the cultivation of potatoes and keeping them in mounds, as well as horse and sheep breeding. In 1816, under the supervision of Scottish engineers, various facilities began to be built: horse mill, water wheel, seed drill, plows, threshers, sifters for flour and grits. A brewery, vodka distillery, tannery, starch factory, and oil press were also opened. It was the third such oil press in the whole country (previously there was only one in Zwierzyniec, owned by Stanisław Zamoyski, and another in Antoni Trębicki's estate in Łomno). After the departure of Ludwik Pac, a large part of the Scots who had come here also left, but even today there are some Scottish descendants in the village. In 1996-2004 and in 2007, the Celtic culture festival Dowspuda was held in the palace ruins.

The village has a population of 180.

The village is home to the remains of Pac Palace from the nineteenth-century.

References

Dowspuda
Suwałki Governorate
Białystok Voivodeship (1919–1939)